The 2014 FIBA Basketball World Cup qualification began in earnest at the 2011 Caribbean Championships, a qualifier to the 2012 Centrobasket, which was in itself a qualifier to the 2013 FIBA Americas Championship. The winners of the 2012 Olympic basketball tournament, the United States, qualified outright. The USA joined the host nation Spain, which was earlier elected to host the 2014 FIBA Basketball World Cup in July 2009.

Qualification would be via each of FIBA's zones, with each zone allocated at least two berths, with additional berths given according to the strengths of the teams within each zone. In this setup, FIBA Europe got six berths, FIBA Americas had 4, FIBA Africa and FIBA Asia, 3 teams each, and FIBA Oceania, 2 berths.

The continental championships in each FIBA zone doubled as a qualifying tournament. The top teams in each tournament qualified to the Basketball World Cup.

In addition, after the continental championships were done, four more wild cards berths were awarded by FIBA to complete the 24-team tournament.

This was the final set of qualification tournaments under this method. FIBA announced that the next edition of the World Cup would be held in 2019, the number of participating teams raised from 24 to 32, FIBA Asia and FIBA Oceania combined into one region for purposes of qualifying for the World Cup, and that qualifying will be done in a home and away format.

Method

Each FIBA zone has a default number of berths, generally following the strengths of the national teams there. These berths, plus four wild cards and the host total in 24. However, a berth is subtracted from the FIBA zone of the Olympic champion; in this case, the United States' gold medal in 2012 reduced FIBA Americas' number of berths from five to four, with the United States qualifying as a result of their 2012 Olympic gold medal.

A total of 117 national teams participated in qualifying. This number included teams that participated but were later suspended (Lebanon and Panama), and excluded hosts Spain, which still participated in qualifying matches, and the United States, which qualified automatically and no longer participated in qualifying matches.

While the different FIBA zones employed any method in qualifying, all conducted their continental championships as qualifying tournaments. Therefore, these continental championships, along with the qualifying for these championships, serve as qualifying matches. In total, 606 qualifying matches were played to determine the qualified teams; excluding the Olympics, 568 matches were played.

List
These were listed by order of qualification.
*Previously a part of Yugoslavia that had 11 appearances, and won in 1970, 1978 and 1990.**Previously a part of the Soviet Union that had 9 appearances, and won in 1967, 1974 and 1982.

Automatic qualifiers

2012 Summer Olympics

The United States defeated Spain in a rematch of the 2008 gold medal game. The United States qualified automatically to the World Cup, taking one of FIBA Americas' five berths.

FIBA Africa
The 2013 FIBA Africa Championship in the Ivory Coast served as the qualifying tournament. With three outright berths, the top three teams qualified. This meant the finalists and the winner of the third-place playoff progressed.

FIBA Africa Championship qualifying

FIBA Africa Championship

Egypt, which qualified after making their last appearance in 1994, and perennial qualifiers Angola got the first two berths for FIBA Africa after advancing to the final of the 2013 FIBA Africa Championship. Senegal defeated host team Ivory Coast on the third-place playoff via a last-second four-point play to take Africa's last outright berth.

FIBA Americas
The 2013 FIBA Americas Championship in Venezuela served as the qualifying tournament. With four outright berths, the top four teams qualified. This meant the semifinalists progressed.

FIBA Americas Championship qualifying

FIBA Americas Championship

On 7 September 2013, Puerto Rico secured their classification to the World Cup after defeating hosts Venezuela 86–85 after extra time in the 2013 FIBA Americas Championship. The next day, the Dominican Republic eliminated Uruguay to qualify; this is the first appearance of the Dominicans in the World Cup since 1978. In the next game, Argentina's victory over Canada ensured that they and Mexico, the 2013 FIBA Americas Champions, qualify, thereby eliminating the Canadians and host Venezuela; the Mexicans returned to the World Cup after their last appearance in 1974. Brazil was chosen as a wild card for the World Cup after having previously lost all three games against Canada, Puerto Rico and Jamaica.

FIBA Asia
The 2013 FIBA Asia Championship in the Philippines served as the qualifying tournament. With three outright berths, the top three teams qualified. This meant the finalists and the winner of the third-place playoff progressed.

FIBA Asia Championship qualifying

FIBA Asia Championship

Iran and the Philippines became the first teams to qualify via the 2013 FIBA Asia Championship in Manila by advancing to the final. Iran made their second consecutive appearance while the Philippines qualified for the World Cup after 35 years of missing the tournament, their last appearance being in 1978 when they hosted the event. Korea, whose last appearance was in 1998, took the third and last automatic Asian berth after winning third place in the said tournament.

FIBA Europe
The EuroBasket 2013 in Slovenia served as the qualifying tournament. With six outright berths, the top six teams qualified. This meant the semifinalists and the participants in the fifth-place playoff progressed. Spain, which has qualified already, participated, finishing within the top six. With this, the seventh-placed team took its place.

FIBA EuroBasket qualifying

FIBA EuroBasket

On 18 September 2013, France secured their third consecutive qualification to the World Cup after beating hosts Slovenia in the EuroBasket 2013 quarterfinals. On the next day, Slovenia qualified after beating Serbia in the 5th–8th Semifinals, while Croatia defeated Ukraine, and Lithuania defeated Italy to both grab tickets to the final tournament. On 20 September 2013, Ukraine qualified for the first time ever after defeating Italy. On the next day, Serbia bounced back from two consecutive losses to win against Italy that led them to the FIBA World Cup after snatching the last outright remaining berth at the EuroBasket 2013. Finland, Greece and Turkey were selected as wild cards for the World Cup berth on 1 February, with Finland, along with newcomers Ukraine, marking their FIBA World Cup debut.

FIBA Oceania

The 2013 FIBA Oceania Championship was a two-legged tie between Australia and New Zealand. Since FIBA Oceania had two outright berths, this meant both teams were already qualified in the 2014 Basketball World Cup provided a team didn't forfeit a match.

Wild card
FIBA selected four wild cards after all of the continental championships were done. FIBA was prohibited from selecting more than three teams from the same continental zone and from selecting teams that did not participate in qualifying either through choice or FIBA-mandated suspension.

On 31 October, FIBA announced that fifteen teams submitted wild card applications. These were:
Africa: 
Americas: ,  and 
Asia:  and 

Of those fifteen, Italy and Germany withdrew before the meeting in Barcelona on 3 February, citing financial reasons. Germany indicated that it was willing to pay up to 300,000 euros for a place but that the sum required by FIBA to receive a place at the World Cup was more in the range of 1 million euros. Gianni Petrucci, chairman of the Italian federation stated that to make an offer in excess of 800,000 euros for a spot would be unethical. On 30 January, a report from Spanish sports newspaper El Mundo Deportivo said that China and Russia also withdrew from wild card contention. There had been no official confirmation from either FIBA or the Chinese or Russian federations on the reported withdrawal. A day later, it was confirmed that the Chinese indeed withdrew from the wild card race, as they could not form a viable team.

References

External links
 

Qualification
2011 in basketball
2012 in basketball
2013 in basketball
FIBA Basketball World Cup qualification